A kernel debugger is a debugger present in some  operating system kernels to ease debugging and kernel development by the kernel developers.  A kernel debugger might be a stub implementing low-level operations, with a full-blown debugger such as GNU Debugger (gdb), running on another machine, sending commands to the stub over a serial line or a network connection, or it might provide a command line that can be used directly on the machine being debugged.

Operating systems and operating system kernels that contain a kernel debugger:
 The Windows NT family includes a kernel debugger named KD, which can act as a local debugger with limited capabilities (reading and writing kernel memory, and setting breakpoints) and can attach to a remote machine over a serial line, IEEE 1394 connection, USB 2.0 or USB 3.0 connection.  The WinDbg GUI debugger can also be used to debug kernels on local and remote machines.
 BeOS and Haiku include a kernel debugger usable with either an on-screen console or over a serial line. It features various commands to inspect memory, threads, and other kernel structures. 
 DragonFly BSD
 Linux kernel; No kernel debugger was included in the mainline Linux tree prior to version 2.6.26-rc1 because Linus Torvalds didn't want a kernel debugger in the kernel.
 KDB (local)
 KGDB (remote)
 MDB (local/remote)
 NetBSD (DDB for local, KGDB for remote)
 macOS - ddb for local, kdp for remote
 OpenBSD includes ddb which has a syntax is similar to GNU Debugger.

References

Debuggers
Operating system kernels